The 10mm Auto (10×25mm, official C.I.P. nomenclature: 10 mm Auto, official SAAMI nomenclature: 10mm Automatic) is a semi-automatic pistol cartridge introduced in 1983. Its design was adopted and later produced by ammunition manufacturer FFV Norma AB of Åmotfors, Sweden.

Although it was selected for service by the Federal Bureau of Investigation (FBI) in 1989, in the aftermath of the 1986 FBI Miami shootout, the cartridge was later decommissioned (except by the Hostage Rescue Team and Special Weapons and Tactics Teams) after their Firearms Training Unit eventually concluded that its recoil was excessive in terms of training for average agents and police officers' competency of use and qualification, and that the pistols chambered for the cartridge were too large for some small-handed individuals. These issues led to the creation of and following replacement by a shorter version of the 10mm that exists today as the .40 S&W, and while the 10mm never attained the mainstream success of this compact variant, there is still an enthusiastic group of supporters and users, and as of 2007, in recent years has started to grow again in popularity.

History

When FFV Norma AB (now Norma Precision AB) designed the cartridge at the behest of Dornaus & Dixon Enterprises, Inc. for their Bren Ten pistol (a newly developed handgun with a design inspired by the CZ 75), the company decided to increase the power over Cooper's original concept. The resulting cartridge—which was introduced in 1983 and produced since—is very powerful, retaining the flat trajectory and high energy of a magnum revolver cartridge in a relatively short, versatile rimless cartridge for a semi-automatic pistol.

One of the first issues with its early acceptance as the result of quality problems as a result of rushed production to meet numerous (some even defaulted) pre-orders of the pistol it was originally—as well as then being only—chambered for: the Bren Ten. An example is the peculiar circumstances surrounding the pistol's distribution at its primary release, leading to a number of initial Bren Tens sent to dealers and customers without magazines (the magazines themselves had complications). The relatively high price of the Bren Ten compared to other pistols of the time (manufacturer's suggested retail price was $500 in 1986, the equivalent of $1,200 United States dollars in 2021) was another factor in its demise, and the company was eventually forced to declare bankruptcy, ceasing operations in 1986 after only three years of inconsistent, substandard production. Had it not been for Colt's Patent Fire Arms Manufacturing Company making the unexpected decision in 1987 to bring out their Delta Elite pistol (a 10mm Auto version of the M1911) and later, the FBI's adoption of the caliber in 1989, the cartridge might have sunk into obsolescence, becoming an obscure footnote in firearms history.

Due to media exposure in the television series Miami Vice, where one of the lead protagonists had used the pistol as his primary signature weapon, demand for the Bren Ten increased after manufacturing ceased. In the succeeding five years, prices on the Standard Model rose to in excess of U.S. $1,400, and original magazines were selling for over U.S. $150.

The Federal Bureau of Investigation briefly field-tested the 10mm Auto using a M1911 pistol and a Thompson Model 1928 submachine gun before adopting the Smith & Wesson Model 1076 in 1990; a short-barreled version of the Model 1026 with its slide-mounted decock/firing pin block safety supplanted by only a frame-mounted decocker. A contract was signed with Heckler & Koch to produce a quantity of the specialized MP5 utilizing the cartridge, designated MP5/10 for use by their Hostage Rescue Team and Special Weapons and Tactics Teams. Since 1994, both units still field the weapon and caliber to this day.

During testing of the caliber in 1988, it was decided that the full-power commercial load of the 10mm Auto was the best available semi-automatic pistol cartridge for law enforcement usage, but it produced excessive recoil for most agents. Thereafter, experiments were carried out, and a specification for reduced-recoil ammunition was created. The requirement was later submitted to Federal Premium Ammunition for production and further review. This became known as the "10mm Lite", or "10mm FBI" load, or attenuated 10mm, remaining common from various manufacturers today. With some pistol reliability problems increasing in this lighter load, Smith & Wesson observed that a version of the 10mm case reduced to 22 millimeters in length from the original 25 mm could be made with the retained performance parameters of the "10mm Lite". This altered cartridge was named the .40 Smith & Wesson. The shorter case allowed use in pistols designed with similar dimensions to those chambered in 9×19mm Parabellum, with the advantage that smaller-handed shooters could now have smaller-frame semi-automatic handguns with near—or in some cases, exact—10mm performance. Colloquially called the "Forty Cal" and other synonyms, this innovation since became a common handgun cartridge among law enforcement agencies and civilians in the United States, while the parent 10mm Auto remains fairly popular.

In 2015, SIG Sauer entered the 10mm marketplace with their P220 model chambered in 10mm.  Ruger introduced a 10mm auto model to their popular SR1911 line in mid 2017, followed by their Blackhawk, Redhawk and 10mm GP100 Match Champion and Wiley Clapp models in 2018. The Springfield Armory XD-M series added a 10mm offering in late 2018. In November 2021, Smith & Wesson introduced 10mm Auto models in the M&P 2.0 series. In 2022 SIG released the 10mm Auto P320-XTEN in the P320 series.
In 2023 Armscor, Colt, Dan Wesson Firearms, Glock, Kimber Manufacturing, Nighthawk Custom, Ruger, SIG Sauer, Smith & Wesson, Springfield Armory, Inc., STI International, and Tanfoglio offer handguns in 10mm Auto.

Dimensions 
The 10mm Auto has 1.56 milliliter (24.1 grain ) cartridge case capacity.

10mm Auto maximum CIP cartridge dimensions

The common rifling twist rate for this cartridge is 406.40 mm (1 in 16 inches), 6 grooves, Ø lands = 9.91 mm (.390 in), Ø grooves = 10.17 mm (.4005 in), and land width = 3.05 mm (.120 in). A large or small pistol primer is used.

In C.I.P. regulated countries, every pistol/cartridge combination is required to be proofed at 130% of this maximum C.I.P. pressure to certify for sale to consumers.

Performance
At mid-range potential, the 10mm Auto produces energy higher than an average mainstream .357 Magnum. The 10mm is slightly less powerful than the .357 Magnum with high-performing commercially-available ammunition, or hand-loaded .357 magnums, and well below standard .41 Magnum rounds. The cartridge is considered to be high-velocity, giving it a less arcing flight path upon firing (also termed "flat-shooting") relative to other handgun cartridges. More powerful loadings can basically equal the highest performing .357 Magnum loads, and retain more kinetic energy at 100 yards than the .45 ACP has at the muzzle.

Usage

The 10mm Auto is marketed for hunting, defensive, and tactical use and is one of the few semi-automatic, rimless cartridges that is legal for hunting white-tailed deer in many U.S. states. The round makes the "Major" power factor ranking in the International Practical Shooting Confederation, even in lighter loadings.

The FBI Hostage Rescue Team, Special Weapons and Tactics Teams, and various other law enforcement agencies continue to issue or authorize the use of 10mm, including: the Coconut Creek Police Department, Glasgow, Montana Police Department, Weimar Police Department, and the San Francisco Bay Area Rapid Transit (BART) Police Department.

In military use, the government of Denmark has issued the Glock 20 to the Slædepatruljen Sirius (Sirius Sledge Patrol) headquartered in Daneborg, Northeast Greenland. The pistols were issued as a last resort defence against polar bears which the unit encounters during patrols.

See also
9×25mm Dillon
10 mm caliber
List of handgun cartridges
Table of handgun and rifle cartridges

References

External links

The Gun Zone – Birth of the 10mm Autopistol Cartridge
BREN-TEN.com Website – The 10mm Auto Cartridge
Cheaper Than Dirt – Cartridge of the Week, the 10mm, 10mm Auto
Blogger – The 10mm Auto pistol cartridge is Alive and Well
Brass Fetcher Ballistic Testing – 10mm Auto
CHUCKHAWKS.COM – 10mm Auto
Ballistics 101 – 10mm Ballistics Chart
Ballistics By The Inch – 10mm Results
Handloads.Com – 10 mm Load Data
Handloads.Com – 10 mm Stopping Power
GunBlast.com – Glock Model 20 10mm Auto Pistol
GunBlast.com – The 10mm
GunBlast.com – Smith & Wesson Brings Back the 10mm Model 610 Revolver
GunBlast.com – The 10mm Auto Pistol
GunBlast.com – Colt Delta Elite 10mm Semi-Automatic Pistol
Modern Firearms: 10mm Auto Cartridge

10mm Auto firearms
Weapons and ammunition introduced in 1983
Military cartridges
Paramilitary cartridges
Pistol and rifle cartridges